Webster A. Young is a composer of symphonies, ballets and operas. His most recent recorded CD is "The Best Violin Melodies of W. A. Young" at Spotify and other music streaming sites. He was the most prolific composer for ballet in the US in the 1980s, before Martins-Torke, working with Eric Hyrst, formerly of the Les Grands Ballets Canadiens, New York City Ballet, and the Royal Ballet of England. Young appears with Eric Hyrst in the film "Two for Ballet", available from Cinema Guild, NY. More recently he has appeared in "Return to Aspen" and "6000 Miles to Ukraine" on Rocky Mountain PBS, (2022)  In 1992, "Two for Ballet" was seen on 63 PBS stations nationwide. The Jerome Robbins Dance Collection at Lincoln Center, NY, has an extensive file on Eric Hyrst's career that also includes videos of the first three Hyrst-Young ballets. Young became the artistic director of the Long Island Opera Company 1998–2003. Young was the first composer in many decades to set Shakespeare's "As You Like It" to music as an opera in four acts. Soprano, tenor, and baritone operas from it are published at MusicNotes.com, and several performances are in videos at YouTube, Vimeo, Dailymotion, Youku, and Toudou.com   Now on his Opus 208. Among his most recent works are several pieces for unaccompanied cello. Other recent works include 20 tangos and 10 salsa pieces for orchestra, some also arranged for piano. Opera arias and piano music published at MusicNotes.com  Young studied composition with Richard Swift, Andrew Frank, Giampaolo Bracali, and notably with Charles Jones - who was acquainted with Stravinsky and a close friend of Darius Milhaud. Young is related through his grandmother, Seena Harbach Purdy, to Otto Harbach, the Broadway lyricist and playwright, who was his great uncle. Otto Harbach's oldest brother, Adolphe, Webster Young's great grandfather, was a band conductor. Young's paternal grandfather, Owen Young, was a semi professional watercolor landscape painter, of whose works a few hundred paintings are extant.  Webster Young is the author of four books: The Palaces of Music (2017), Music, Painting and Jung (2012), and The Little Flowers of the Desert Brothers (2017) "Music in the Church" (2021)

Works

Operas
 The Wrong Party (1994) (comedy)
 The Sun Also Rises (1996) (permission granted by the Hemingway estate 1995)
 Madrid (1998) (libretto based on Hemingway)
 Stocks, Bonds, and Doggerel (1999) (comedy)
 As You Like It (2000) (Libretto from Shakespeare's play)
 Orpheus (2002) (based on the myth and The Bacchae by Euripides)

Symphonies
 Symphony 1977 - Davis to Paris
 Symphony No. 2 1982"
 Symphony No. 3 "California" Symphony No. 4 "Oregon" Symphony No. 5 "The Gold Guitar" (2014)

Ballets
All were created with Eric Hyrst, choreographer d. 1996.

 Summer Ballet (1985) (4 act scenario by Young)
 Album (1985) (based on Commedia dell'Arte by Hyrst)
 Polonaise (1986) (abstract, by Hyrst)
 Vintage (1987) (scenario by Young)
 Tango (1987) (abstract by Hyrst)
 Ballet Scenes 1987 (scenario by Hyrst)
 Waltzes (1988) (scenario by Young)
 The Judgement of Paris (1989) (based on the myth by Hyrst & Young)
 Air for Strings (1990) (abstract by Hyrst)

 Books 
 Music, Painting, and Jung (2012) 
 The Little Flowers of the Desert Brothers (2017) 
 The Palaces of Music‎ (2017) 
 Music in the Church'' (2021)

References

American male classical composers
American classical composers
American opera composers
Male opera composers
20th-century classical composers
21st-century classical composers
Living people
21st-century American composers
20th-century American composers
20th-century American male musicians
21st-century American male musicians
Year of birth missing (living people)